Gwynne A. Wilcox is an American attorney who has served as a board member of the National Labor Relations Board since August 2021.

Early life and education
Wilcox obtained a Bachelor of Arts from Syracuse University and a Juris Doctor from the Rutgers Law School.

Career
Wilcox is a Fellow of the College of Labor and Employment Lawyers. She is also a member of the Labor and Employment Law sections of both the American Bar Association and New York State Bar Association. She is a partner at Levy Ratner, P.C, an employment law firm that deals with unions. Part of Wilcox's work is to represent unions before the NLRB.

Nomination to NLRB
On May 26, 2021, President Joe Biden nominated Wilcox to be a member of the National Labor Relations Board. The Senate HELP Committee held hearings on her nomination on July 15, 2021. On July 21, 2021, the committee favorably reported her nomination to the Senate floor. Wilcox was confirmed by the entire Senate on July 28, 2021, by a roll call vote of 52–47. She was sworn into her position on August 4, 2021.

Awards and honors
Wilcox is the recipient of Syracuse University’s Chancellor’s Citation for Distinguished Achievement. She has also won the Peggy Browning Fund’s Lifetime Achievement Award.

See also
Political appointments by Joe Biden

References

Living people
American lawyers
Biden administration personnel
Syracuse University alumni
Year of birth missing (living people)
National Labor Relations Board officials
Rutgers Law School alumni